A cassette demagnetizer is a device that removes the magnetic field that accumulates during the use of audio cassettes in cassette decks.  

The passage of magnetically charged tape over the metallic parts of the tape deck imparts a magnetic polarity that can reduce fidelity in recording and playback. Demagnetizers (also called degaussers) remove this polarity.

Demagnetizers of the cassette type resemble cassettes and contain circuitry to demagnetize tape heads.

Demagnetizers of the wand type demagnetize anything that they touch, including tape heads and capstans. The wand's advantage lies in its demagnetizing other metal parts of the tape path, not just the heads. Used carelessly, it can increase the magnetization of the heads; if used too close to tapes, it can erase them.

The types of demagnetizer described above contain electronic circuitry and require a power source (either a battery or a power cord). A third design consists of a cassette shell with a head cleaning tape wound on the spools and a magnetic disc mounted above the head cleaner tape. When the deck "plays" the cassette, the tape cleans the heads and simultaneously the magnet rotates, creating the alternating magnetic field required for demagnetizing.

Some cassette decks demagnetizes themselves. These work by feeding the record head a high-frequency signal, whose amplitude is great at first and then is reduced to zero over a few seconds.

Audio storage